Neohirasea is a genus of stick insects in the tribe Necrosciini, erected by J.A.G. Rehn in 1904.  Species has been recorded from temperate and tropical Asia, including: China, India, Japan, Malaysia and Vietnam.

Species
The Phasmida Species File lists:   
 Neohirasea asper (Redtenbacher, 1908)
 Neohirasea biserrata Ho, 2018
 Neohirasea bispina Ho, 2018
 Neohirasea catbaensis Ho, 2018
 Neohirasea cochinchinensis (Redtenbacher, 1908)
 Neohirasea coomani Ho, 2018
 Neohirasea gaudichaudi (Redtenbacher, 1908)
 Neohirasea guangdongensis Chen & He, 2008
 Neohirasea hilli Ho, 2018
 Neohirasea hongkongensis Brock & Seow-Choen, 2000
 Neohirasea hujiayaoi Ho, 2017
 Neohirasea japonica (de Haan, 1842)- type species (as Phasma japonicum de Haan)
 Neohirasea maerens (Brunner von Wattenwyl, 1907)
 Neohirasea nana (Carl, 1913)
 Neohirasea nanlingensis Ho, 2017
 Neohirasea obesus (Brunner von Wattenwyl, 1907)
 Neohirasea stephanus (Redtenbacher, 1908)
 Neohirasea unispina Ho, 2017
 Neohirasea unnoi Brock, 1999

References

External links

Phasmatodea genera
Phasmatodea of Asia
Phasmatidae